Ticllacocha (possibly from Quechua tiklla two-colored / eyelash, qucha lake, lagoon,) is a lake in Peru located in the Lima Region, Yauyos Province, Tanta District.

See also
 Nor Yauyos-Cochas Landscape Reserve
 List of lakes in Peru

References

Lakes of Peru
Lakes of Lima Region